Kaloor-Kadavanthra Road a major arterial road of Kochi City, also known as KK Road is one of the three north-south arteries in the city of Kochi. Kaloor-Kadavanthra Road starts from Kadavanthra Junction and ends at Kaloor, the two major junctions in the city of Kochi. Kaloor-Kadavanthra Road intersects the Sahodaran Ayyappan Road from Vytila (East) to Pallimukku Junction (West) at Kadavanthra Junction. The South extension of the Kaloor-Kadavanthra Road is the KP Vallon Road. Most of the long distance buses that connect the city to the regions to the south and southeast use this road to reach their main terminal at Kaloor. This 3.2 km long, 22 m wide, 4-lane city highway was planned to ease the load on the busy MG Road. The city is divided into two parts by the railway line running in a north-south direction. This road fills the need for an artery on the eastern sector, avoiding the choke points of the two railway overpasses.
The road also has many prominent banks along its route like the State Bank of India at Grand bay, ICICI, Bank of India, HDFC, Central Bank of India -Kallelil Building, Kadavanthra Jn: etc.
The road was in a pitiable conditions before this modern state.

References

Roads in Kochi